Matti is a surname. Notable people with the surname include:

 Andreas Matti (born 1959), Swiss actor
 Erik Matti (born 1965), Filipino filmmaker
 Peter Matti (born 1965), Swiss former slalom canoer
 Ueli Matti (born 1959), Swiss former slalom canoer, brother of Peter Matti